Microsechium is a genus of flowering plants belonging to the family Cucurbitaceae.

Its native range is Mexico to Central America.

Species:

Microsechium compositum 
Microsechium gonzalo-palomae 
Microsechium hintonii 
Microsechium palmatum

References

Cucurbitaceae
Cucurbitaceae genera